Doug Wellsandt (born February 9, 1967) is a former American football tight end. He played for the New York Jets in 1990.

References

1967 births
Living people
American football tight ends
Washington State Cougars football players
New York Jets players